Hohenwerfen Castle is a medieval rock castle, situated on a  precipice overlooking the Austrian market town of Werfen in the Salzach valley, approximately  south of Salzburg. The fortress is surrounded by the Berchtesgaden Alps and the adjacent Tennen Mountains. Hohenwerfen is a "sister" of Hohensalzburg Fortress, both built by the Archbishops of Salzburg in the 11th century.

The castle became known internationally as the main location in the film Where Eagles Dare.

History

Gebhard, an ally of Pope Gregory VII and the anti-king Rudolf of Rheinfelden, had three major castles extended to secure the route across the Eastern Alps along the Salzach river against the forces of King Henry IV of Germany: Hohenwerfen, Hohensalzburg and Petersberg Castle at Friesach in Carinthia. Nevertheless, King Henry had Gebhard expelled in 1077 and the archbishop could not return to Salzburg until 1086, only to die at Hohenwerfen two years later.

In the following centuries Hohenwerfen served Salzburg's rulers, the prince-archbishops, not only as a military base but also as a residence and hunting retreat. The fortress was extended in the 12th century and to a lesser extent again in the 16th century during the German Peasants' War, when in 1525 and 1526 riotous farmers and miners from the south of Salzburg moved towards the city, laying fire and severely damaging the castle.

Alternatively it was used as a state prison and therefore had a somewhat sinister reputation. Its prison walls have witnessed the tragic fate of many 'criminals' who spent their days there – maybe their last – under inhumane conditions, and, periodically, various highly ranked noblemen have also been imprisoned there including rulers such as Archbishop Adalbert III, arrested by his own ministeriales in 1198; Count Albert of Friesach (in 1253); the Styrian governor Siegmund von Dietrichstein, captured by insurgent peasants in 1525; and Prince-Archbishop Wolf Dietrich Raitenau, who died here in 1617 after six years of imprisonment.

In 1931 the fortress, owned by Archduke Eugen of Austria since 1898, was again damaged by a fire and, though largely restored, finally had to be sold to the Salzburg Reichsgau administration in 1938. In World War II, the castle served as a Gauführerschule, a nazi education camp under Gauleiter administration. After the war it was used as a training camp by the Austrian Gendarmerie (rural police) until 1987.

Currently, the bastion functions as a museum. Among the numerous attractions offered by the fortress are guided tours showing its extensive weapons collection, the historical Salzburg Falconry with the falconry museum as well as a fortress tavern. The historic Falconry Centre is a special attraction, offering daily flight demonstrations using various birds of prey, including eagles, falcons, hawks, and vultures.

Owners 
Formerly the castle belonged to the Habsburg family of Austria. The estate is now owned by the state of Salzburg.

In popular culture
 In the 1968 film Where Eagles Dare the castle featured as the fictional Schloß Adler that is raided by a S.O.E. paratroop team during World War II.
 In the Amazon Video original series The Man in the High Castle (2015) the castle was used as the Führer's headquarters.
 The castle can be seen in the background of the "Do-Re-Mi"  picnic scene in The Sound of Music starring Julie Andrews, which was filmed on a hillside showing the village of Werfen.
 In the video game Call of Duty: Black Ops III, the zombies map "Der Eisendrache" is based on 'Hohenwerfen Castle'.

References

External links

Official website
History of Hohenwerfen Castle

Castles in Salzburg (state)
Tourist attractions in Salzburg (state)
Museums in Salzburg (state)
Historic house museums in Austria